Valentin Jacob (born 15 June 1994) is a French professional footballer who plays as a midfielder for Dijon.

Career
On 6 June 2018, Jacob signed with Chamois Niortais for three seasons, after scoring 15 goals in 28 matches with Annecy FC. He made his professional debut for Niort in a 2–1 Ligue 2 win over Red Star on 27 July 2018.

On 25 May 2021, Jacob joined Ligue 2 side Dijon on a three-year deal.

References

External links
 
 
 Chamoius Niortais Profile

1994 births
Living people
Footballers from Paris
French footballers
Association football midfielders
Chamois Niortais F.C. players
AJ Auxerre players
CS Sedan Ardennes players
Dijon FCO players
Ligue 2 players
Championnat National 2 players